Morula uva is a species of sea snail, a marine gastropod mollusk in the family Muricidae, the murex snails or rock snails.

Distribution
This species occurs in the Red Sea and the Indian Ocean off Aldabra, Chagos, Madagascar, the Mascarene Basin and Tanzania.

References

 Kilburn, R.N. & Rippey, E. (1982) Sea Shells of Southern Africa. Macmillan South Africa, Johannesburg, xi + 249 pp. page(s): 87
 Drivas, J. & M. Jay (1988). Coquillages de La Réunion et de l'île Maurice
 Houart R., Kilburn R.N. & Marais A.P. (2010) Muricidae. pp. 176–270, in: Marais A.P. & Seccombe A.D. (eds), Identification guide to the seashells of South Africa. Volume 1. Groenkloof: Centre for Molluscan Studies. 376 pp.

External links
 Illustration of Ricinula shells plate 395, legend p. 169.  "Ricinula nodus. R. Morus Lamk. VII. 232. Vulgairment aussi la Mûre." is figure 6.  M. Bruguiere (1791) Tableau encyclopédique et méthodique des trois règnes de la nature. Contenant l'helminthologie, ou les vers infusoires, les vers intestins, les vers mollusques, &c.; Paris.

uva
Gastropods described in 1798